Vladimír Padrta (7 October 1952 – 15 September 2009) was a Slovak basketball player. He competed in the men's tournament at the 1976 Summer Olympics. Later he worked as a sport journalist.

See also
Czechoslovak Basketball League career stats leaders

References

1952 births
2009 deaths
Slovak men's basketball players
Olympic basketball players of Czechoslovakia
Basketball players at the 1976 Summer Olympics
Sportspeople from Brno